38th Street station is a light rail station on the Blue Line in Minneapolis, Minnesota.

This station is located at the intersection of 38th Street and Minnesota State Highway 55 (Hiawatha Avenue), in Minneapolis. This is a center-platform station. Service began at this station when the Blue Line opened on June 26, 2004.

Bus connections
From 38th Street Station, there are direct bus connections to Metro Transit routes 14, 22, and 23.

Popular culture
The announcer for this station can be heard on the opening of "Arthur's Song" by Atmosphere on the album Southsiders.

Notable places nearby
 Corcoran, Howe, Longfellow and Standish neighborhoods
Hiawatha LRT Trail
 Roosevelt High School (Minneapolis School District)
 Roosevelt Community Library

External links 
Metro Transit: 38th Street Station

Metro Blue Line (Minnesota) stations in Minneapolis
Railway stations in the United States opened in 2004
2004 establishments in Minnesota